Summit is a village within the town of Coventry, Rhode Island.

Summit developed as a railroad village near Greene, Rhode Island with "half-dozen white clapboard houses [which] center around a church, a library, and a store." The original Summit Baptist Church building was constructed in 1862 and served the congregation until a new building was constructed nearby in 2001. The Coventry Historical Society now owns the old church building and maintains exhibits at the nearby Summit library. The Summit General Store, dating to 1888, is still in business.

References

Villages in Kent County, Rhode Island
Coventry, Rhode Island
Census-designated places in Kent County, Rhode Island
Providence metropolitan area
Villages in Rhode Island
Census-designated places in Rhode Island